Melanochromis lepidiadaptes is a species of cichlid endemic to Lake Malawi where it is only known from off of Makanjila Point on the southeastern shore.  This species can grow to a length of  SL.

References

lepidiadaptes
Fish of Lake Malawi
Fish of Malawi
Fish described in 1997
Taxa named by Nancy Jean Bowers
Taxa named by Jay Richard Stauffer Jr.
Taxonomy articles created by Polbot